Football Queensland is recognised by both the State and Federal Governments and Football Australia as the governing body for association football and futsal in Queensland, Australia.

Tracing its history back to the establishment of the Anglo-Queensland Football Association, in 1884, Football Queensland now has more than 250,000 participants and 308 clubs across the state.

Role
Football Queensland is the sole governing body for football in Queensland with nine regional offices throughout the state:
 Football Queensland Central
 Football Queensland Darling Downs
 Football Queensland Far North & Gulf
 Football Queensland Metro (North & South)
 Football Queensland Northern
 Football Queensland South Coast
 Football Queensland Sunshine Coast
 Football Queensland Whitsunday Coast
 Football Queensland Wide Bay

These regional offices were established in 2021 as part of the Future of Football 2020+ Reforms to better reflect the geography and strategic direction of the regions throughout Queensland. During the reform journey, the local football community was invited to engage in a six-month state-wide consultation process based on improving four key areas of the game: Governance, Administration, Competitions and Affordability.

Each regional office has a local administrator and committee members which are elected by clubs to meet quarterly to discuss functional and geographical matters.

Competitions
Football Queensland organises men’s and women’s competitions including the National Premier Leagues Queensland (NPL), which acts as the top tier of football in the state.

The Football Queensland Premier League (FQPL) sits below the NPL and connects the entire state via three conferences: the SEQ Conference, Central Conference and Northern Conference.

The NPL Queensland Men sits within the SEQ Conference.

Women's
The NPL Queensland Women sits within the SEQ Conference.

The Central Conference includes the FQPL Wide Bay and FQPL Central Coast and is connected to the rest of the state via the FQPL framework. From 2022, the top teams from each competition will play off against one another in a Champions League-style competition throughout each season to determine the Central Conference winner.

The Northern Conference includes the FQPL Whitsunday Coast, FQPL Northern and FQPL Far North & Gulf and is connected to the rest of the state via the FQPL framework. From 2022, the top teams from each competition will play off against one another in a Champions League-style competition throughout each season to determine the Northern Conference winner.

References

External links
 Football Queensland official website
 Football Queensland Facebook
 Football Queensland Twitter
 Football Queensland YouTube

 
Que
Soccer in Queensland
Sports governing bodies in Queensland
Sports organizations established in 1884